Asplundia helicotricha is a species of plant in the Cyclanthaceae family. It is endemic to Ecuador.  Its natural habitats are subtropical or tropical moist lowland forests and subtropical or tropical moist montane forests.

References

helicotricha
Endemic flora of Ecuador
Least concern plants
Taxonomy articles created by Polbot